Mong Kok Ferry Pier (1924–1972) was a ferry pier to the west of Shantung Street, Mong Kok, Kowloon, Hong Kong, located inside the old Yau Ma Tei Typhoon Shelter. The site was covered over during land reclamation under the West Kowloon Reclamation Project.

History
The pier started operation in 1924 when the Hong Kong and Yaumati Ferry Company took over the franchise for ferry services from Sham Shui Po, Mong Kok, Yau Ma Tei to Central.

In the 1960s, the pier had its bus terminus, with KMB routes 2B, 11C, 12B and 13D parked there. The pier was later demolished and replaced by the nearby Tai Kok Tsui Ferry Pier in 1972.

References

Demolished piers in Hong Kong
1924 establishments in Hong Kong
Buildings and structures demolished in 1972
Mong Kok
Victoria Harbour
1972 disestablishments in Hong Kong